Saul Busby (14 June 1875 – 8 November 1932) was a Guyanese cricketer. He played in three first-class matches for British Guiana from 1897 to 1900.

See also
 List of Guyanese representative cricketers

References

External links
 

1875 births
1932 deaths
Guyanese cricketers
Guyana cricketers
Sportspeople from Georgetown, Guyana